Aminabad (also Romanized as Amīnābād) is a village in Zanjanrud-e Bala Rural District, in the Central District of Zanjan County, Zanjan Province, Iran. At the 2006 census, its population was 1,101, in 259 families.

References 

Populated places in Zanjan County